
Year 340 BC was a year of the pre-Julian Roman calendar. At the time it was known as the Year of the Consulship of Torquatus and Mus (or, less frequently, year 414 Ab urbe condita). The denomination 340 BC for this year has been used since the early medieval period, when the Anno Domini calendar era became the prevalent method in Europe for naming years.

Events 
 By place 

 Persian Empire 
 Rhodes falls to Persian forces.
 Pixodarus, the youngest of the three sons of King Hecatomnus of Caria, gains possession of the satrapy of Caria by expelling his sister Ada, the widow and successor of her brother Idrieus.

 Greece 
 When King Philip II of Macedon attacks Perinthus and Byzantium, King Artaxerxes III of Persia sends support to those cities.
 Philip II fails in his siege of Byzantium and is forced to respond to attacks by the Scythians near the mouth of the Danube. His son, Alexander is regent while his father fights against Byzantium and the Scythians.
 The Athenians give Demosthenes a public vote of thanks after Philip's unsuccessful siege of Byzantium.
  Derveni papyrus in a nobleman's grave in a necropolis of Lete.

 Sicily 
Hicetas, the tyrant of Leontini, again persuades Carthage to send a large army to Sicily, which lands at Lilybaeum. Timoleon of Syracuse meets this large Carthaginian army in the Battle of the Crimissus in the west of Sicily and achieves a brilliant victory against superior odds. Despite this victory, the Carthaginians continue to occupy the western half of Sicily, with a treaty being concluded that confines the Carthaginians to the area west of the Halycus (Platani) River.

 Roman Republic 
 An embassy is sent by the Latin peoples to the Roman Senate asking for the formation of a single republic between Rome and Latium, in which both parties would be considered to be equal. As Rome considers that it is the leader of the Latin League, it refuses to treat the Latin people as being equal politically, or to have Latin people in the Roman Senate. With Rome's refusal of the proposal, the Latin War begins. The Latins fight with the Campanians, while Rome joins the Samnites to attack the Latins. Only the Laurentes in Latium and the equites of Campania remain with the Romans, who, for their part, find support among the Paeligni.
 The Roman-Samnite army under consuls Publius Decius Mus and Titus Manlius Torquatus attack and defeat the Latins and Campanians near Mount Vesuvius in the Battle of Vesuvius.
 The Romans succeed in detaching the Campanians from their alliance with the Latins (through their fear of the Samnites) and induce them to make a separate peace. Three Campanian cities, including Capua and Cumae, are granted Roman citizenship and thus become part of the Roman state. The Roman state now extends to the Bay of Naples.

Births 
 Appius Claudius Caecus, Roman politician and consul (approximate date)
 Chandragupta Maurya, founder of the Maurya Empire (approximate date)
 Qu Yuan, Chinese poet and minister (approximate date)
 Wuling of Zhao, Chinese king of Zhao (d. 295 BC)

Deaths 
 Lais of Hyccara, Greek hetaira (courtesan) (approximate date)
 Mentor of Rhodes, Greek mercenary and satrap (approximate date)
 Xuan of Chu, Chinese king of Chu (Warring States Period)

References